The 2019 Southern Conference men's soccer season wias the 24th season of men's varsity soccer in the conference. The season began in late August 2019 and concluded in mid-November 2019.

UNCG won the regular season and Mercer won the tournament.

Background

Previous season 
The 2018 season saw Mercer win the regular season championship, posting a 12-4-2 overall record and a 5-1-0 record in SoCon play.

Head coaches

Preseason

Preseason poll 
The preseason poll was released on August 21, 2019.

Preseason national polls 
The preseason national polls will be released in July and August 2019.

Regular season

Early season tournaments 

Early season tournaments will be announced in late Spring and Summer 2019.

Results 

All times Eastern time.† denotes Homecoming game

Week 1 (Aug. 25–31)

Week 2 (Sep. 1–7)

Week 3 (Sep. 8–14)

Week 4 (Sep. 15–21)

Week 5 (Sep. 22–28)

Week 6 (Sep. 29–Oct. 5)

Week 7 (Oct. 6–12)

Week 8 (Oct. 13–19)

Week 9 (Oct. 20–26)

Week 10 (Oct. 27–Nov. 2)

Postseason

SoCon Tournament

NCAA tournament

Rankings

National rankings

Regional rankings - South Region 

The United Soccer Coaches' south region ranks teams among the ACC, Atlantic Sun, and SoCon.

Awards and honors

Players of the Week

Postseason honors

2020 MLS Draft

The 2020 MLS SuperDraft was held in January 2020.

Homegrown players 

The Homegrown Player Rule is a Major League Soccer program that allows MLS teams to sign local players from their own development academies directly to MLS first team rosters. Before the creation of the rule in 2008, every player entering Major League Soccer had to be assigned through one of the existing MLS player allocation processes, such as the MLS SuperDraft.

To place a player on its homegrown player list, making him eligible to sign as a homegrown player, players must have resided in that club's home territory and participated in the club's youth development system for at least one year. Players can play college soccer and still be eligible to sign a homegrown contract.

References

External links 
 Southern Conference Men's Soccer

 
2019 NCAA Division I men's soccer season